Inder Mohan Verma (born 28 November 1947) is an Indian American molecular biologist, the former Cancer Society Professor of Molecular Biology in the Laboratory of Genetics at the Salk Institute for Biological Studies and the University of California, San Diego. He is recognized for seminal discoveries in the fields of cancer, immunology, and gene therapy.

Verma was the editor-in-chief of the journal Proceedings of the National Academy of Sciences of the United States of America (PNAS) from 2011 to 2018, but stepped down after being named in a gender discrimination lawsuit against the Salk Institute. In April 2018 the Salk institute placed him on leave for "unspecified allegations"; Verma himself stated that the leave was connected to the same lawsuit, but it came shortly before publication of an exposé alleging decades-long sexual harassment and assault of multiple women by Verma. In June 2018 he resigned his position at the Salk Institute, before the board of trustees of the institute could take action regarding these allegations.

Early life and education
Inder M. Verma was born in 1947 in Sangrur, Punjab, India and educated at Lucknow University. He received his Ph.D. from the Weizmann Institute of Science in Israel in 1971.

Career and research
After his PhD, Verma conducted his postdoctoral research in the laboratory of Nobel laureate David Baltimore at MIT. In 1974, Verma joined the Salk Institute as an Assistant Professor. He was promoted to Associate Professor in 1979, and Professor in 1985. He also holds an Adjunct Professor appointment at the University of California, San Diego. Among his professional activities, he is a member of the Board of Scientific Governors of The Scripps Research Institute. He is currently at the center of a lawsuit alleging systematic discrimination against women scientists at the Salk Institute.

Verma is a recognized leaders in gene therapy, retrovirology, and cancer. His work on viruses and cancer led to the identification of several oncogenes, including c-fos, and their function in normal cells. His development of  virus mediated gene transfer techniques, including a stripped down version of HIV, has become the foundation for gene therapy to cure several congenital as well as adult onset diseases including cancer. The viral vectors are routinely used in molecular biology laboratories.

Awards and honors

 2009: American Society of Gene and Cell Therapy Outstanding Achievement Award 
 2008: Vilcek Prize in Biomedical Sciences
 2008: AAISCR Lifetime Achievement Award
 2006: Member of the American Philosophical Society
 2005: Foreign Fellow, Indian National Science Academy (INSA)
 2000: Fellow, American Academy of Arts and Sciences (revoked)
 1999: Member, Institute of Medicine of The National Academy of Sciences (USA) 
 1998: Associate Member, European Molecular Biology Organization (EMBO)
 1997: Elected a Member of the National Academy of Sciences (USA)
 1997: Foreign Fellow, The National Academy of Sciences, India
 1997: Fellow, American Society for Microbiology
 1990: American Cancer Society Professor of Molecular Biology
 1988: NIH Outstanding Investigator Award
 1987: NIH MERIT Award

Personal life
He married Grietje van der Woude in 1973. They have a daughter Simone, who lives in La Jolla. They have twin granddaughters, Sophie and Marijke.

In April 2018, Science published accounts by eight women who accuse Verma of sexual harassment from 1976 to 2016. On 20 April 2018 Salk’s board of trustees put Verma on administrative leave, 2 days after receiving a list of questions from Science concerning the allegations and the institute’s responses to previous complaints about Verma’s behavior. The American Association for the Advancement of Science removed his Fellow title after the allegations were confirmed.

References

1947 births
21st-century American biologists
American medical researchers
Cancer researchers
Indian medical researchers
Living people
Massachusetts Institute of Technology faculty
Members of the United States National Academy of Sciences
Foreign Fellows of the Indian National Science Academy
People from Sangrur
University of Lucknow alumni
Weizmann Institute of Science alumni
Proceedings of the National Academy of Sciences of the United States of America editors
Fellows of the AACR Academy
Members of the National Academy of Medicine
Fellows of the American Academy of Arts and Sciences
Fellows of the American Association for the Advancement of Science
Members of the American Philosophical Society
Salk Institute for Biological Studies people
American physicians of Indian descent